Interstate 55 (I-55) is a major north–south Interstate Highway in the US state of Illinois that connects St. Louis, Missouri, to the Chicago metropolitan area. The road also runs through the Illinois cities of Springfield, Bloomington, and Joliet. The section in Cook County is officially named the Stevenson Expressway, and in DuPage County its officially named the Joliet Freeway or the Will Rogers Freeway. The section from the south suburbs of Chicago to the area near Pontiac is officially named the Barack Obama Presidential Expressway after the 44th President, Barack Obama, who launched his political career from Illinois.

Route description
I-55 within Illinois carries heavy traffic, with an average of more than 20,000 vehicles per day for most of its length. Significant portions of I-55 contain six lanes (three lanes in each direction) and are heavily used by commuters. I-55 in Illinois begins in East St. Louis on the Poplar Street Bridge over the Mississippi River at the Missouri state line and runs southwest to northeast through the state, ending in Chicago at US 41 (Lake Shore Drive). Along the way, it goes through four metropolitan areas in the state: the Illinois portion of the St. Louis metropolitan area, the Springfield metropolitan area, the Bloomington–Normal metropolitan area, and the Chicago metropolitan area (also known as Chicagoland).

East St. Louis to Springfield
I-55 enters Illinois on the Poplar Street Bridge from Missouri, running concurrently with I-64 and US 40. The highway meets Illinois Route 3 (IL 3) at a series of complex interchanges. Still in East St. Louis, I-64 and IL 3 leave I-55/US 40, while the current routing of I-70 joins the pair. The three routes continue north-northeast, intersecting the southern terminus of IL 203 near Granite City, IL 111 near Fairmont Park, I-255 and IL 157 in Collinsville, and IL 159 in Maryville.

Approximately  after the IL 159 interchange, US 40 leaves I-55/I-70. After an interchange with IL 162 in Troy, I-70 heads east toward Effingham. At the same interchange, I-270 intersects I-55 and ends. On its way further north, I-55 intersects IL 143 near Edwardsville, IL 140 in Hamel, IL 4 south of Livingston, local roads that connect to Livingston and Staunton, and IL 138 near White City. About  further north, I-55 intersects IL 16 at a larger interchange to the west of Litchfield. It then goes another  before meeting the eastern terminus of IL 108 to the east of Carlinville. Continuing along, it meets the southern and northern termini of IL 48 and IL 127 west of Raymond, local roads to Farmersville and Divernon, IL 104 near Auburn, and two local roads to Glenarm and Chatham. At the East Lake Drive interchange, I-55 crosses over Lake Springfield into Springfield proper.

Springfield to Bloomington
I-55 enters Springfield at an interchange with Toronto Road. About  further north, it meets I-72 and US 36 to form a  concurrency that skirts the southern and eastern edges of the city. At the same interchange, it meets the southern end of I-55 Business (I-55 Bus.). I-55/I-72/US 36 has two interchanges while on the concurrency: Stevenson Drive/East Lake Drive and IL 29.  north, I-72 and US 36 head east toward Decatur and Champaign. At this interchange, I-55 intersects IL 97, which leads to downtown Springfield. I-55 then crosses the western terminus of IL 54 (old US 54).  further north, it meets the northern terminus of I-55 Bus., effectively leaving Springfield.

From Springfield to Chicago, I-55 follows a northeast–southwest path. In Williamsville, it meets IL 123 near its eastern terminus. It crosses two local roads, providing access to Elkhart and Broadwell before heading north into Lincoln. In Lincoln, I-55 meets the southern terminus of the second I-55 Bus. It then heads due north to intersect IL 10 and the northern terminus of IL 121.  north, it meets the southern terminus of I-155. At this interchange, it heads due east to meet the northern terminus of I-55 Bus. before resuming its northeasterly–southwesterly course through northern Illinois. I-55 meets an interchange with a local road leading to Atlanta, US 136 in McLean, and another local road near Shirley before entering the Bloomington–Normal area.

Bloomington to Joliet
Once entering Bloomington, I-55 forms a complex interchange with the southern terminus of the final I-55 Bus. to the north and I-74/US 51 to the east. At this interchange, I-74 and US 51 overlap I-55 around the western edge of the cities. The highway has one interchange at US 150 and IL 9. I-74 splits from I-55/US 51  further north to head toward Peoria and the Moline–Rock Island area. Before leaving Bloomington–Normal, I-55 has two more interchanges with US 51 Business (US 51 Bus.) and I-55 Bus.

From Bloomington to Joliet, I-55 continues its northeasterly–southwesterly trek while skirting the western edges of various towns along the way. It meets local roads connecting Towanda and Lexington, US 24 in Chenoa, IL 116 and IL 23 in Pontiac, a local road to Odell, IL 17 and IL 47 in Dwight, and IL 53 in Gardner.

I-55 starts showing hints of entering the Chicago metropolitan area after the IL 53 interchange. It passes through Forest Preserve areas between Gardner and Joliet. After IL 53, I-55 intersects a local road and IL 113 near Braidwood and meets a partial interchange at IL 129; drivers who want to access IL 129 from southbound I-55 can connect via IL 113. Continuing north, I-55 intersects local roads in industrial areas before entering Channahon. It has two interchanges with Bluff Road and US 6.  north, it meets I-80, which forms the boundary of Channahon and Joliet.

Joliet to Chicago
From I-80, I-55 enters the Joliet area by means of Shorewood, with a partial interchange at IL 59 and a full interchange with US 52. It enters Joliet proper with an interchange at US 30. It then connects with IL 126 near Plainfield, forming a partial interchange, then enters the Bolingbrook–Romeoville area, meeting interchanges at Weber Road and IL 53 again.

On the border of Romeoville and Lemont, I-55 meets I-355 and a former routing of US 66 at a large, complex interchange. It then meets Lemont Road near Lemont, Cass Avenue and IL 83 near Darien, and County Line Road in Burr Ridge. It enters another large, complex interchange with I-294 and another former routing of US 66 in Indian Head Park. Further east, it meets a large interchange with US 12/US 20/US 45 south of Countryside. After the IL 43 interchange, I-55 enters Chicago.

North of I-90/I-94, I-55 intersects various city streets at partial interchanges before reaching its national northern terminus at US 41 (Lake Shore Drive).

History
I-55 in Illinois is the fourth road to connect St. Louis and Chicago. The first was the Pontiac Trail in 1915. This was largely improved and paved as the new IL 4 by 1924. In 1926, IL 4 was designated as the route of the new US 66, and a new section of US 66 was built to bypass slower sections of IL 4 south of Springfield by 1930. Through the 1950s, US 66 was continually widened, straightened, and improved to handle its growing traffic, until its entire length was four lanes wide by 1957.

The roots of I-55 could be traced back to the need of a national highway system. President Dwight D. Eisenhower saw the need of a national network of highways that would help with the mobilization of the army. He had been impressed with the autobahn he saw in Germany during World War II. In 1956, he signed the Federal Aid Highway Act into existence. Although the act provided for a highway replacing US 66, it was spared destruction for a while because of it being more modern than other routes at the time. Illinois would build its first new Interstate Highways on other routes, such as I-80, I-57, and I-70, before turning its attention once again to the St. Louis–Chicago route.

However, during the 1970s, US 66 was finally replaced by I-55 as the fourth St. Louis–Chicago highway, serving most of the same communities along the way as the original Pontiac Trail. It was built in sections across Illinois, often on the original US 66 roadbed. A common construction tactic, where US 66 was already four lanes wide, was to build new southbound lanes for I-55 west of the original road, then rebuild the original southbound lanes of US 66 to be the new northbound lanes for I-55, leaving the original northbound lanes of old US 66 as a two-way frontage road. One can find many signs posted for Historic US 66, especially where it deviates from I-55.

The earliest stretch of I-55 was a portion of US 66 which had already been built as a freeway between Gardner and I-294 (Tri-State Tollway) in Indian Head Park, and which was added to the Interstate System by simply erecting new signs in 1960. Later portions of the highway were built in the 1960s between East St. Louis and Hamel, as bypasses of Springfield and Bloomington-Normal. The rest of the road was completed in the 1970s.

The Stevenson Expressway opened on October 24, 1964, as the Southwest Expressway. It was renamed after Adlai Stevenson II, the former governor of Illinois, on September 1, 1965, a month and a half after his death. The Stevenson's original termini were US 66 in DuPage County to the west and the Dan Ryan Expressway to the east.

In 1999–2000, the expressway was completely rebuilt from Central Avenue north to Lake Shore Drive, including the ramps to the Dan Ryan. The Illinois Department of Transportation (IDOT) was criticized at the time for not adding a fourth lane in each direction to the highway.

Upgrades and later construction
Because of the heavy traffic on I-55, IDOT spends millions of dollars per year maintaining the roadway, adding lanes, and replacing bridges to increase the capacity of the highway.

In northeastern Illinois near Joliet, a widening project that expanded I-55 from two to three lanes in each direction between I-80 (exit 250) and Weber Road (exit 263) was completed on October 29, 2008.

In the 2000s, the Damen Avenue (exit 290) and Pulaski Road (exit 287) interchanges were rebuilt as a single-point urban interchange (SPUI) configuration; in 2014, reconstruction as a SPUI was completed for the Central Avenue (exit 285) interchange. In November 2011, IDOT started a two-year pilot project, allowing Pace bus routes 755 and 855 to ride on the dedicated shoulder lanes in a given time. This bus on shoulder service consisted of three sections: from I-355 to County Line Road, I-294 to IL 50, and IL 50 to Kedzie Avenue. In the latter half of 2014, then-Governor Pat Quinn signed a bill which made the I-55 bus on shoulder service permanent. It also allow Pace to expand its bus on shoulder service within and outside I-55. The Arsenal Road (exit 245) interchange was under complete rebuilding and reconfiguration , and the deteriorated overpass at IL 129 (exit 238) was removed in 2012 in anticipation of future construction of a full interchange, temporarily leaving the IL 129 interchange with only a northbound exit and northbound entrance.

At St. Louis, the Stan Musial Veterans Memorial Bridge carrying I-70 across the Mississippi River, and costing $667 million (equivalent to $ in ), was completed in 2014 to relieve congestion on I-55's Poplar Street Bridge.

Between late 2015 and late 2017, the US 41 (Lake Shore Drive) interchange was being reconstructed to widen two I-55 offramps and its interchange approach.

Future
In early 2016, Governor Bruce Rauner, as well as IDOT, made a proposal to explore expanding a portion of I-55 (from I-355 to I-90/I-94) by adding an additional lane in each direction to ease congestion. Under their proposal, toll lanes would be constructed and operated through a potential public–private partnership. Noise walls would also be constructed as part of the project.

Exit list

Related routes

Auxiliary routes
I-55 has three auxiliary routes in Illinois:
: A spur from I-55 in Lincoln to I-74 just east of Peoria.
: The eastern third of the beltway around the St. Louis Metro Area (with I-270 forming the other two-thirds)
: The Veterans Memorial Tollway, serving the western and southwestern suburbs of Chicago, running from I-80 in New Lenox to I-290 in Addison
: I-55 has three business loops in Illinois.

References

External links

Stevenson Expressway Timeline at the Chicago Public Library
Historic, Current & Average Travel Times For The Stevenson Expressway

55
 Illinois
Expressways in the Chicago area
Roads in Greater St. Louis
Transportation in St. Clair County, Illinois
Transportation in Madison County, Illinois
Transportation in Macoupin County, Illinois
Transportation in Montgomery County, Illinois
Transportation in Sangamon County, Illinois
Transportation in Logan County, Illinois
Transportation in McLean County, Illinois
Transportation in Livingston County, Illinois
Transportation in Grundy County, Illinois
Transportation in Will County, Illinois
Transportation in DuPage County, Illinois
Transportation in Cook County, Illinois